Jack Joseph Rose (born 31 January 1995) is an English professional footballer who plays as a goalkeeper for Sutton United.

Career

West Bromwich Albion
Rose started his career with West Bromwich Albion, rising through the youth system and signing his first professional contract in June 2013.

In November 2014, Rose signed for Accrington Stanley on a month's loan after injuries to fellow loanees Aaron Chapman and Jesse Joronen, making his debut on 9 November in the FA Cup against Notts County, keeping a clean sheet in the 0–0 draw. He made his football league debut on 15 November against Carlisle United.

Rose signed for Crawley Town in March 2016 on loan for the rest of the season. He played five league games for the Sussex-based club.

Rose was released from West Brom on 30 June 2017.

Southampton
Rose joined Southampton in August 2017 on a one-year deal and signed a new two-year contract in June 2018.

He joined Walsall on a season long loan deal on 8 July 2019.

Walsall
In September 2020, Rose signed a permanent contract at Walsall. Rose was released at the end of the 2021–22 season.

Sutton United
On 1 July 2022, Rose joined League Two club Sutton United after his departure from Walsall.

Career statistics

References

External links
 

1995 births
Living people
English footballers
Sportspeople from Solihull
Footballers from the West Midlands (county)
Association football goalkeepers
West Bromwich Albion F.C. players
Accrington Stanley F.C. players
Crawley Town F.C. players
Southampton F.C. players
Walsall F.C. players
Sutton United F.C. players
English Football League players